Nuke (Francis "Frank" Simpson) is a fictional supervillain appearing in American comic books published by Marvel Comics. Created by writer Frank Miller and artist David Mazzucchelli, the character first appeared in Daredevil #232 (July 1986). Nuke's most distinguishing feature is an American Flag tattooed on his face.

A variation of Nuke named Will Simpson appeared in the first and second seasons of Marvel's Netflix television series, Jessica Jones, portrayed by Wil Traval.

Publication history

Nuke was created by Frank Miller and David Mazzuchelli. He first appeared in Daredevil #232. Nuke largely disappeared following his apparent death in Daredevil #233, although his origin was explored and touched upon in issues of Captain America and Wolverine. It was not until Grant Morrison's New X-Men, when it's revealed Nuke was involved in the Weapon Plus program, that the character made a return in subsequent stories.

Fictional character biography
Frank Simpson was a test subject of the Weapon Plus program, the supersoldier program that had created Captain America and would later have their Weapon X facility transform Wolverine into a killing machine. The enhancing and conditioning process went awry, leaving Nuke seriously deranged.

Early life
The origins of Nuke are explained in Wolverine: Origins.

The disturbed son of a wealthy, abusive, alcoholic, upper-class woman in Ohio, Frank soon developed an unhealthy affection for his babysitter, the only real maternal figure in his life. The young woman, who was harboring feelings for his father Charles Simpson, capitalized on Frank's affection and talked the boy into killing his mother. Wolverine, at that time an operative for Weapon Plus, had been sent to kidnap Frank. Wolverine showed up, dressed as a cop. He then stalked Charles and the babysitter, eventually shooting the girl with Charles's gun, after which Charles committed suicide. Wolverine then went to Frank's place and abducted him for the supersoldier project.

Years later, Frank Simpson was sent into the Vietnam War as a black-ops agent. Captured by the Viet Cong, Frank was severely tortured by Logan (who was posing as a Russian intelligence liaison), shattering Frank's still unbalanced mind. While torturing him (even carving the American flag into his face that years later would become part of his superpowered personality), he implanted the phrase "No V.C.!" as a trigger word, along with the compulsion to kill gruesomely, in retaliation for the tortures suffered, anyone who uttered the words. He then allowed Frank to escape, testing his work with a village of peasants, who, seeing an American soldier, tried to soothe his anger and convince him to spare them, shouting the "No V.C.!" phrase, meaning that they were not Viet Cong. Frank, in response to the trigger word, burnt the village to the ground, killing every inhabitant. The experiment being a success, Logan was installed as his handler. Due to his trauma, Nuke often hallucinates that the enemies he is fighting are the Viet Cong.

At some time during the war, Nuke was inducted into the final part of the Project Homegrown, the Weapon VII programs, that turned him into a partial cyborg with a subdermal mesh able to deflect bullets, and a second heart that, working in conjunction with some (placebo) pills, controlled his aggression, leaving him addicted as well. His whereabouts after the war are still unknown.

First appearance
Nuke resurfaces employed by Generalissimo Felix Guillermo Carridad of Tierra Verde to destroy a rebel base. Carridad is impressed with his skills, and he enjoys using Nuke periodically as a superhuman iconic symbol. Following an operation in Nicaragua, the Kingpin hires Nuke through a corrupt general and sends him to kill Daredevil. Nuke launches an attack on Hell's Kitchen, but is defeated by Daredevil. Enraged at a Daily Bugle article reporting on his mass murder in Hell's Kitchen, he escapes his handlers, intending to destroy the Daily Bugle building. He is intercepted by Captain America and shot by a military chopper. He faints from the wound and is presumed dead by the general public. Nuke was taken into custody by the government, still controlled by the Tierra Verde enclave.

Wolverine: Origins – The Death of Wolverine
In the series Wolverine: Origins, following Wolverine's full memories regained, and embarking on a mission to take care of loose ends, the U.S. government dispatches Nuke to hunt Wolverine down. Though Wolverine dispatches Nuke, it is revealed that Nuke's enhanced physiology has further mutated, giving him cybernetic limbs, bones and skull, and the ability to survive the most gruesome injuries, but has left him devoid of any personality or conscience. When Wolverine tries to kill him, Captain America intervenes, believing that Nuke is a failed subject of the Super Soldier Program. Wolverine asks the telepath Emma Frost to restore Nuke's broken mind, saying that he'll euthanize Nuke if he determines this is not possible.

During Norman Osborn's tenure as the head of the American peace-keeping organization H.A.M.M.E.R., the character uses the "Scourge" alias and added to the Thunderbolts, and is demoted from the position of team leader. During Osborn's final confrontation, he sustains injuries that render him comatose.

Simpson is allied with the Iron Nail, attacking individuals in Europe that he perceives as enemies of America, until he is stopped by Captain America. He is caught in an explosion and presumed dead. Nuke later appears alive with a shaved head in the Death of Wolverine mini-series. He is seen working for Madame Hydra and hunting Wolverine as part of her bounty. While at a bar in British Columbia, Wolverine's adamantium skull headbutts Nuke to spread the word that he spared him while also getting the information on who placed the bounty on him.

Powers and abilities
Nuke possesses various superhuman physical attributes as a result of various cybernetic enhancements. Nuke's bones have been replaced with advanced cybernetic components, granting him superhuman strength of an unrevealed limit. Aside from his strength, Nuke's body is considerably more resistant to physical injury than that of an ordinary human; even the arcane nerve strikes Daredevil learned during training by his sensei, Stick, have no effect. Nuke's skin has been replaced with an artificial type of plastic that looks identical to human skin but is much more durable. In addition, he has an artificial secondary heart that works in conjunction with his colored pills. Nuke is the victim of decades of systematic physical and psychological conditioning at the hands of various individuals working for the United States government. As a result, Nuke is insane. He is now little more than a puppet in the hands of his current handler, and able only to follow issued commands. Also in his first appearance in Daredevil, Nuke was equipped with a monstrous multi-barrelled assault rifle which, in addition to being able to fire massive volleys of bullets, fragmentation grenades, and rockets, was also (due to mechanisms left unexplained) able to "keep count" of the casualties inflicted. Nuke also had a habit of resetting the counter after noting down each "score" trying to "better" it in the coming assignment.

Apparently Nuke's metabolism is now remote controlled from a secret base on Tierra Verde, whose technicians are able to shut down the biomech systems in Nuke's body.

Pills
Nuke has a second heart, and takes different colored pills to produce different bodily effects.
Nuke's pill colors are: red, for increased adrenaline; white, to keep him balanced between missions; and blue, to bring him down.

It was originally stated that the red pills Nuke took affected his adrenal glands, sending him into his bloodthirsty rages. The Wolverine: Origins series retconned this, stating instead that these pills are placebos, suggesting that Nuke lives in a constant state of increased adrenaline, but is not aware of this. The pills, therefore, trigger his violent behavior, but the effect is psychosomatic.

Other versions
In the "House of M" storyline, Nuke is one of the government agents (alongside Mimic and Agent Barnes) sent to Genosha to kill Magneto and as many of his followers as possible. He and Mimic served as a distraction while Agent Barnes snuck into Magneto's headquarters. When Nuke entered Wanda's bedroom in order to kill her, he was disassembled by her.

What If vol. 2 #48 showed what would have happened if Daredevil had saved Nuke. This story manifests as Ben Urich pondering the situation and thinking of alternatives.

The Ultimate Marvel version of Frank Simpson is the man who was given the Super Soldier Serum during the Vietnam War when Captain America was MIA after World War II, but his origin is more reminiscent of a post World War II equivalent. Like his mainstream counterpart, Simpson has the American Flag tattooed onto his face. Simpson, completely disillusioned by America after Vietnam (1972), is believed to have betrayed his country due to the war and the augmentations but has "seen the Light". He is trying to sell his reverse-engineered serum blood to the North Koreans, but is stopped by British S.A.S. and Steve Rogers. After his identity is revealed to Carol Danvers, Cap is beaten, and travels to Saloth, a Cambodian village but Simpson and his army (all pumped up with the Super-Soldier Serum) beat the Captain. Simpson vows to make Cap "see the light", strongly believing America stands for a number of atrocities in the last 50 years but Cap escapes and stops Simpson. He is brought into S.H.I.E.L.D. custody. Simpson is later visited by Cap in the Triskelion, which has the Captain reading the Bible to Simpson who is now bed-ridden.

In the Amalgam Comics universe, in which the characters of Marvel Comics were merged with those of DC Comics, Nuke is combined with DC's Bane as Hydra agent Bane Simpson.

In other media
A variation of Nuke named William "Will" Simpson appears in the first and second seasons of the Marvel Cinematic Universe (MCU) / Netflix live-action television series, Jessica Jones, portrayed by Wil Traval. This version is a police sergeant at the NYPD's 15th Precinct who previously served in the 39th Infantry Division. He is initially sent by Kilgrave to kill Trish Walker until Jessica Jones convinces Simpson that his mission is complete. Kilgrave orders him to jump off a rooftop, but Jones saves Simpson by knocking him out and taking him to the ground level, freeing him of Kilgrave's control. after which Simpson becomes Walker's lover As a result, Simpson becomes determined to murder Kilgrave to stop him from hurting anyone else, putting him at odds with Jones. Following a failed attempt on Kilgrave's life, Simpson reconnects with his military unit, using experimental pills to increase his combat awareness. However, he becomes more manic, to the point where he kills fellow detective Oscar Clemons and two fellow operatives to guarantee that only he can kill Kilgrave. Simpson later attempts to kill a wounded Jones, but is thwarted by her and Walker, with the latter taking some of his combat enhancements to defeat him. Left unconscious, Simpson is taken away by members of the mysterious "IGH" organization, who provided him with the supplements. As of the second season, Simpson is now using an inhaler and spying on Walker. He eventually catches up to her, but she shoots him in the leg. When Jones finds and confronts Simpson about the deaths of several IGH members, he states that Walker is being targeted because of an investigation into the organization before they are abruptly attacked by Alisa Campbell, who later kills Simpson before escaping. Afterwards, Jones and Walker take his body to the beach near Playland Park and toss him into the ocean.

References

External links
 Nuke at Marvel.com
 

Cyborg supervillains
Fictional mercenaries in comics
Fictional super soldiers
Fictional Vietnam War veterans
Comics characters introduced in 1986
Marvel Comics martial artists
Marvel Comics mutates
Marvel Comics characters with superhuman strength
Marvel Comics cyborgs
Marvel Comics supervillains
Marvel Comics male supervillains
Marvel Comics television characters
Fictional assassins in comics
Characters created by Frank Miller (comics)